Pierre Angelot was a French wrestler. He competed in the freestyle middleweight event at the 1920 Summer Olympics.

References

External links
 

Year of birth missing
Year of death missing
Olympic wrestlers of France
Wrestlers at the 1920 Summer Olympics
French male sport wrestlers
Place of birth missing